Holocelaeno is a genus of mites in the family Macrochelidae. There are about six described species in Holocelaeno.

Species
These six species belong to the genus Holocelaeno:
 Holocelaeno costai
 Holocelaeno jasius
 Holocelaeno melisi
 Holocelaeno neophanei
 Holocelaeno palaeno
 Holocelaeno singeri

References

Macrochelidae
Articles created by Qbugbot